Françoise Bourdin (1952 – 25 December 2022) was a French novelist.

Biography
Françoise Bourdin was born in Paris, France. Her father Roger Bourdin and her mother Géori Boué were both professional opera singers. As a child she was interested in writing. She had already obtained her jockey license when she was 18, before she lost her first love in a racing accident a year later. She started her novel, Les soleils mouillés, when she was 20. Bourdin cut back on her writing as she had children. She returned to writing when she was 40 with Les sirènes de Saint-Malo.

Bourdin sold some 40 books in the last 25 years for a total of eight million sales. In 2011, she was in the 11th place on the French best-seller list.

Bourdin died on 25 December 2022, at the age of 70.

Works
 Les Soleils mouillés, éd. Julliard, 1972
 De vagues herbes jaunes, 1973 
 Sang et Or, 1991
 Mano à Mano, éd. Denoël, 1991 ; éd. Belfond, 2009
 Les Vendanges de juillet, éd. Belfond, 1994, 520 pages
 Juillet en hiver, 1995
 Terre Indigo .  éd TF1 1996 
 La Camarguaise, 1997
 Comme un frère, 1997
 Nom de jeune fille, 1999
 Les Vendanges de juillet, 1999 
 L'Homme de leur vie, éd. Belfond, 2000 ; éd. Pocket, 2004
 Le Secret de Clara, éd. Belfond, 2000 ; éd. Pocket, 2004
 L'Héritage de Clara, éd. Belfond, 2001
 L'Héritier des Beaulieu, éd. Belfond, 2003, 320 pages.
 Les Sirènes de Saint-Malo, éd. Belfond, 2006, 333 pages
 Les Bois de Battandière, éd. Belfond, 2007, 312 pages
 Une nouvelle vie, éd. Belfond, 2008, 348 pages
 La Maison des Aravis, éd. Belfond ; éd. Pocket, 2004
 Un été de canicule, éd. Belfond ; éd. Pocket, 2004
 Les Années passion : Le roman d'une femme libre, éd. Belfond ; éd. Pocket, 2004
 Un mariage d'amour, éd. Belfond ; éd. Pocket, 2004
 Choix d'une femme libre, éd. Belfond ; éd. Pocket, 2005
 Rendez-vous à Kerloc'h, éd. Belfond ; éd. Pocket, 2006
 Objet de toutes les convoitises, éd. Belfond ; éd. Pocket, 2006
 Une passion fauve, éd. Belfond ; Pocket, 2007
 Bérill ou la passion en héritage, éd. Belfond ; Pocket, 2007
 L'Inconnue de Peyrolles, éd. Belfond ; éd. Pocket, 2008
 Un cadeau inespéré, éd. Belfond ; éd. Pocket, 2008
 Une nouvelle vie, éd. Belfond, 2008 
 Dans le silence de l'aube, éd. Belfond, 2008 
 Sans regrets, éd. Belfond, 2009, 
 Un soupçon d'interdit éd. France Loisirs, (Réf : 412544), 2009
 D'espoir et de promesse, éd. Belfond, 2010, 
 Les Landes en héritage, tome 1 : Des grondements de l'océan, éd. Belfond, 2011, 
 Le Testament d'Ariane, éd. Belfond, 2011
 Dans les pas d'Ariane  éd. Belfond, 2011
 Serment d'automne, éd. Belfond, 2012, 
 BM Blues, éd. Belfond, 2012, 105 pages
 D'eau et de feu, éd. Belfond, 2013
 Galop d’essai, éd. Belfond, 2014, 
 La promesse de l'océan, éd. Belfond, 2014, 
 Un nouveau départ pour changer de vie, éditions Omnibus, 2014,

References

1952 births
2022 deaths
Writers from Paris
20th-century French women writers
21st-century French women writers
French women novelists
20th-century French novelists
21st-century French novelists